Hitesh Kumar Bagartti is an Indian politician and member of the Bharatiya Janata Party. Bagartti is a former member of the Odisha Legislative Assembly from the Khariar constituency in Nuapada district.

Early life
Hitesh Kumar Bagartti was born in 1966 to Kunja Bihari Bagartti in a Hindu Gouda (Yadav) family, which caste is the dominant caste group in  Nuapada district of Odisha.

References 

People from Nuapada district
Bharatiya Janata Party politicians from Odisha
Members of the Odisha Legislative Assembly
Living people
21st-century Indian politicians
1966 births